Hossein Seifzadeh (born May 26, 1950) is an Iranian-American political scientist and author.  Seifzadeh is a retired professor of political science and international relations at the University of Tehran. He was forced to resign from his full-time academic position, due to his opposition to  moral cosmopolitan perspectives and current crimes against Human Rights in Iran. Hossein Seifzadeh has written 28 books, 22 of which are used as textbook in various universities in Iran, Afghanistan and Tajikistan. His other 6 books were declined to be published in Iran and are considered as politically "inappropriate".
He has also written 235 English and Persian academic papers, published in various academic journals and presented in seminars, conferences and symposiums around the world.

Hossein Seifzadeh refuses to get involved with political parties. His approach favors developmental and educational methods to empower citizens and alert them to their human rights in order to protect them.

In 2018, Hossein Seifzadeh taught at New York State University (SUNY)-Geneseo. He is currently retired and resides in Maryland, United States.

Hossein Seifzadeh is the younger brother of Mohammad Seifzadeh. Mohammad Seifzadeh is an Iranian Human Rights lawyer and activists.

See also 
 List of political scientists
 List of Iranian scientists and scholars

References

Iranian political scientists
Academic staff of the University of Tehran
1950 births
Living people
Persian-language writers
People from Qom